Dave Nickerson (born April 30, 1944) is a Canadian politician from Northwest Territories, Canada.

Before politics
In 1965, Nickerson arrived in the Northwest Territories and worked at the Discovery and Giant Mines. He then left this position to establish his own minerals exploration business.

Political career
Nickerson was elected to the Legislative Assembly of Northwest Territories for Yellowknife North in the 1975 Northwest Territories general election. He served almost a full term before vacating his seat in 1979 to run in the 1979 Canadian federal election.

Nickerson defeated his fellow MLA David Searle to win the new Western Arctic riding for the Progressive Conservative Party of Canada. He would serve 3 terms in the House of Commons of Canada.

Nickerson was defeated in the 1988 Canadian federal election by Ethel Blondin-Andrew from the Liberal Party of Canada.

Electoral results

References

External links

1944 births
Members of the Legislative Assembly of the Northwest Territories
Members of the House of Commons of Canada from the Northwest Territories
Progressive Conservative Party of Canada MPs
Living people
People from Yellowknife